Hell and Back is a nine-issue comic book limited series, first published by Dark Horse Comics in July 1999–April 2000, and the seventh and final volume in Frank Miller's Sin City series.

Plot

It tells the story of Wallace, an artist/war hero/short order cook who saves a suicidal woman named Esther. She likes his art and they go out for a drink. They are ambushed by two men, who drug Wallace and kidnap Esther. The Colonel and Liebowitz are a suspected part of this conspiracy. Wallace spends the night in the drunk tank, after being dragged out of the gutter by two of Basin City's (notoriously corrupt) police officers, Manson and Bundy, and upon his release seeks out Esther. He is crossed again by police officers after he tells Commissioner Liebowitz he plans to find Esther. He then dispatches them, leaving them bound and naked. After locating Esther's home, he finds her apartment occupied by Delia, who claims to be Esther's roommate.

Wallace and Delia are attacked by The Colonel's new manservant, Manute, but they escape. A sniper attacks from a nearby window, whom Wallace takes out by shooting him through the scope of his rifle. Delia tries unsuccessfully to seduce him as they are pursued by two more assassins in a Mercedes, which Wallace also disposes of.

Wallace and Delia meet up with an old war buddy referred to only as Captain. He borrows a Chevrolet Nomad known as The Heap from him and Wallace and Delia turn in for the night at the Last Hope Motel.

Wallace handcuffs her to the bed for what she believes is foreplay, when he reveals that he knows she cannot be Esther's roommate, because Esther's clothes would have the smell of Delia's cigarettes on them. Just then, Wallace is drugged by a sniper for the second time. He wakes at the Santa Yolanda Tar Pits, where Delia, Gordo, and a drug wizard named Maxine are preparing to abandon his car in the pits. Maxine gives him a huge dose of a hallucinogenic drug.

A large portion of the comic, wherein he finds himself hallucinating, is then done in full color. After a surreal sequence involving a crashing fighter jet, trash-talking cherubs, and dinosaurs, the car hits a tree. He discovers a young girl dead in the trunk. The police show up, as does Captain, who kills the police. Captain explains he'd have gotten there sooner if it wasn't for snipers establishing a perimeter. They torture one remaining sniper and find out where Delia, Gordo, and Maxine were heading and pursue them. During this sequence the Captain morphs into various pop culture icons, including King Leonidas from Frank Miller's 300, Lone Wolf and Cub, an ED-209 droid from the RoboCop movies, Big Guy and Rusty the Boy Robot, Captain America, Dirty Harry, John Rambo, Martha Washington from Give Me Liberty, Hägar the Horrible and even Hellboy. This portion is entirely in color.

They shoot past Delia, Maxine and Gordo at a gas station. As they begin driving again, Wallace and Captain ambush them, with Captain disabling the Hummer with a rocket launcher. As they move in, Gordo mortally wounds Captain as Wallace shoots Gordo in the face. At gunpoint, Wallace makes Maxine concoct an antidote to reverse his hallucinogenic frame of mind. As she does, he shoots her in the head and shoots Delia through the gut when he suffers a panic attack. After blacking out for a few seconds, Wallace finds himself back in a black and white "normal" world, Maxine dead and Delia wounded. Paralyzed from the waist down, she begs for mercy. Wallace does so by shooting her in the back of the head. He then carries Captain's body back to the Heap and drives away.

He meets up with another war buddy named Jerry, the Captain's lover. They burn Captain's body in a funeral pyre, where afterwards they work trying to flush the rest of the drugs out of Wallace's system. Mariah, another female mercenary working for The Colonel, is assigned to Delia's task in her stead. The Colonel is now killing anyone linking Wallace to him, starting with the doctor who kidnapped Esther. He even has Mariah break Liebowitz's teenage son's arm after luring him away from his high school. He then threatens Liebowitz's family even further, putting the commissioner in a moral quandary.

Wallace confronts Liebowitz in his apartment and tries to get him to join his side. Wallace discovers that the real scheme The Colonel is operating is a slave trafficking and organ harvesting ring of which Liebowitz was in fact (intentionally or otherwise) unaware of. Wallace explains how he launched a one-man assault on the factory, first infiltrating the complex, cutting a swathe of stealthy death through the roster of guards and discovering the myriad atrocities going on there. He was then confronted by Mariah and The Colonel as well as many, many armed guards. Wallace managed to escape the factory with his own life but without saving anyone, much to his own chagrin.

At this point, the phone rings in Liebowitz's apartment: "They know you're here", Liebowitz tells Wallace. It's The Colonel, telling Wallace where Esther is: she is at the Roark family farm, long since abandoned at this point. The deal is simple: Wallace's silence for Esther's safe return. When Wallace finds her, an enemy helicopter arrives and opens fire, Wallace shielding Esther with his body. However, Wallace is one step ahead: Jerry, who was up on a hill with heavy ordnance, blasts the chopper out of the sky with a rocket launcher; Wallace, who was wearing a Kevlar vest, survived the chopper's machinegun fire miraculously. Wallace takes Esther to the hospital and he and Jerry prepare to make a second assault on The Colonel's base of operations, when a flood of people are brought in on stretchers.

By this time, the police have launched a massive raid on The Colonel's factory, where The Colonel is captured. The Colonel threatens Liebowitz, who in return shoots him in the head for hurting his son and tells his underlings to "make a missing person outta the fucker". Wallenquist (the criminal lord behind the whole operation) lets it all be square, against the strong wishes of Mariah, (who somehow escaped the factory raid,) seeing neither power nor profit in revenge; He seeks revenge on neither Wallace nor Liebowitz.

Weeks later, Wallace and Esther leave town. He asks her why she wanted to jump and she responds "I was lonely". They drive away towards a better life away from Sin City.

Collected editions
The series has been collected into a trade paperback.

External links

1999 comics debuts